Mikko Outinen (born April 7, 1971) is a Finnish former professional ice hockey player. KooKoo of the Finnish Liiga retired his number (#36) after nine seasons with the franchise.

Career statistics

External links

1971 births
Living people
Finnish expatriate ice hockey players in Canada
Finnish expatriate ice hockey players in the United States
Finnish ice hockey defencemen
KooKoo players
People from Kuusankoski
Regina Pats players
Västerviks IK players
Victoria Cougars (WHL) players
Waco Wizards players
Weyburn Red Wings players
Sportspeople from Kymenlaakso